Pelisge Harrison (born July 24, 1964) is a Sri Lankan United National Party politician, current member of the Parliament for Anuradhapura District current cabinet Minister of Social Empowerment and former Minister of Rural Economic Affairs. Harrison first entered parliament in 1994 from the United National Party within a few years from his graduation from the University of Kelaniya.

He is the Minister of Agriculture, Rural Economic Affairs, Livestock Development, Irrigation, Fisheries and Aquatic Resources Development.

References
Sri Lanka Parliament profile

1964 births
Living people
United National Party politicians
Sri Lankan Buddhists
Members of the 10th Parliament of Sri Lanka
Members of the 11th Parliament of Sri Lanka
Members of the 12th Parliament of Sri Lanka
Members of the 13th Parliament of Sri Lanka
Members of the 14th Parliament of Sri Lanka
Members of the 15th Parliament of Sri Lanka